ISO 3166-2:CZ is the entry for Czechia in ISO 3166-2, part of the ISO 3166 standard published by the International Organization for Standardization (ISO), which defines codes for the names of the principal subdivisions (e.g., provinces or states) of all countries coded in ISO 3166-1.

Currently, ISO 3166-2 codes are defined for two levels of subdivisions within the country:
 13 regions and 1 capital city
 76 districts

Each code consists of two parts, separated by a hyphen. The second part is either of the following:
 two digits: regions
 three characters (two digits followed by a digit or a letter): districts

For the districts, the first two digits indicate the region that the district is in (based on the original NUTS code of the region):
 10 and 11: Prague
 20: Central Bohemian Region
 31: South Bohemian Region
 32: Plzeň Region
 41: Karlovy Vary Region
 42: Ústí nad Labem Region
 51: Liberec Region
 52: Hradec Králové Region
 53: Pardubice Region
 63: Vysočina Region
 64: South Moravian Region
 71: Olomouc Region
 72: Zlín Region
 80: Moravian-Silesian Region

Current codes
Subdivision names are listed as in the ISO 3166-2 standard published by the ISO 3166 Maintenance Agency (ISO 3166/MA).

Subdivision names are sorted in Czech alphabetical order: a (á), b, c, č, d (ď), e (é) (ě), f, g, h, ch, i (í), j, k, l, m, n (ň), o (ó), p, q, r, ř, s, š, t (ť), u (ú) (ů), v, w, x, y (ý), z, ž.

Click on the button in the header to sort each column.

Regions

 Notes

Districts

Changes
The following changes to the entry have been announced in newsletters by the ISO 3166/MA since the first publication of ISO 3166-2 in 1998:

The following changes to the entry are listed on ISO's online catalogue, the Online Browsing Platform:

Codes before Newsletter I-2

See also
 Subdivisions of the Czech Republic
 FIPS region codes of the Czech Republic
 NUTS codes of the Czech Republic

External links
 ISO Online Browsing Platform: CZ
 Regions of the Czech Republic, Statoids.com
 Districts of the Czech Republic, Statoids.com

2:CZ
ISO 3166-2
ISO 3166-2
Czech Republic geography-related lists